Skala is a surname which is particularly common in the Czech Republic and neighbouring countries, where it is a habitational surname for someone from a place near a rock. Descended from Proto-Slavic *skala, the surname may appear as:
 Skála (feminine: Skálová) in the Czech Republic
 Skala (feminine: Skalová) in Slovakia
 Skała in Poland
 Скала in Ukraine

People

Skála, Skálová 
 František Skála (born 1956), Czech artist
 Jaroslav Skála (1916–2007), Czech psychiatrist
 Jaroslav Skála (basketball) (1954), Czech basketball player
 Jiří Skála (1973), Czech footballer
 Josef Skála (born 1952), Czech politician
 Marek Skála (born 1989), Czech skier
 Viktor Skála (born 1968), Czech actor
 Zuzana Skálová (born 1945), Czech historian

Skala 
 Brian Skala (born 1981), American actor
 Jan Skala (1889–1945), Sorbian journalist
 Steven Skala (1955), Australian investment banker

See also
 

Czech-language surnames
Czech toponymic surnames
Sorbian-language surnames